Several schools are named Tyndale Christian School. They include:
Tyndale Christian School (New South Wales) in Blacktown, New South Wales, Australia
Tyndale Christian School (South Australia) in Salisbury East, South Australia, Australia
Tyndale Christian School, Murray Bridge, South Australia
Tyndale Christian School, Strathalbyn, South Australia
Tyndale Christian School (Calgary) in Calgary Alberta, Canada